Alan Alex Symington Bennett (born 29 September 1949) is a Scottish former footballer, who played for Crystal Palace, Morton, Hamilton Academical, Dumbarton and East Stirlingshire.  After moving to Australia, he went on to play for Victorian State League sides Green Gully Ajax, later known as Green Gully, and the Melbourne-based team called Albion Rovers. He also played a single game for National Soccer League side Brisbane Lions.

References

1949 births
Scottish footballers
Crystal Palace F.C. players
Greenock Morton F.C. players
Hamilton Academical F.C. players
Dumbarton F.C. players
East Stirlingshire F.C. players
Scottish Football League players
Living people
Place of birth missing (living people)
Association football wing halves